R. Narayanaswami (1919-1992), popularly known by his pen name Karichan Kunju, was a Tamil short-story writer and novelist who wrote mainly on historical themes.

References 

 

1919 births
1992 deaths
Tamil writers